Gregory Galloway (born 1962) is an American fiction writer.  His first novel, As Simple as Snow, was released by Putnam in 2005. Though the book was meant for an adult audience, it has taken off with teen readers.

Biography 

The son of a juvenile probation officer, Gregory Galloway was born and raised in the small, southeastern Iowa town of Keokuk, located near the confluence of the Des Moines and Mississippi Rivers.  The idea of writing presented itself to Galloway while he was in the throes of adolescence at Keokuk High School.

Galloway later graduated with MFAs in both fiction and poetry from the Iowa Writer’s Workshop at the University of Iowa, in Iowa City.  He worked at a downtown record store while attending college, a job driven by his longstanding interest in music.

His interest in music played a pivotal role in As Simple as Snow, a mystery about a highly intense and intelligent Goth teenager, Anastasia Cayne, who goes missing in the middle of winter. The only clue to her disappearance is a dress left outstretched like an arrow near a hole in an icy river and a cryptic tape she leaves for the unnamed male narrator. The novel is draped in codes and clues that leave the reader speculating what will come of the relationship between Anna and the narrator.

His second novel, The 39 Deaths of Adam Strand, which follows a summer in the life of a boy named Adam Strand, who, no matter how hard he tries, cannot die, was published by Dutton in February 2013.

Galloway currently lives in Hoboken, New Jersey, with his wife.

Books 
(2005) As Simple as Snow. Penguin Publishing Group. .
(2011) Careful & Other Stories
(2013) The 39 Deaths of Adam Strand. Penguin Young Readers Group. 
(2021) Just Thieves. Mellville House Publishing.

Awards 
The 2006 Alex Awards from the American Library Association

References 

Steve Horowitz. "How Easily Snow Covers Everything: An Interview with Gregory Galloway", PopMatters.com, 23 March 2006. Retrieved on 2008-05-04.
Carolyn Murnick. "Gregory Galloway: the whodunit may seem old hand, but with his debut novel, Gregory Galloway gives the form a 21st-century spin", Interview Magazine, March 2005. Retrieved on 2008-05-04.

External links 
As Simple as Snow website
The 39 Deaths of Adam Strand tumblr

21st-century American novelists
American male novelists
Living people
Writers from Hoboken, New Jersey
People from Keokuk, Iowa
University of Iowa alumni
Iowa Writers' Workshop alumni
21st-century American male writers
Novelists from New Jersey
1962 births